Tappeh Bashi (also Romanized as Tappeh Bāshī) is a village in Ivughli Rural District, Ivughli District, Khoy County, West Azerbaijan Province, Iran. At the 2006 census, its population was 448, in 111 families.

References 

Populated places in Khoy County